Petersburg Township may refer to:

 Petersburg Township, Jackson County, Minnesota
 Petersburg Township, Nelson County, North Dakota, in Nelson County, North Dakota

	
Township name disambiguation pages